Betzdorf is a commune and town in the canton of Grevenmacher, in eastern Luxembourg. 

, the town of Betzdorf, which lies in the north-east of the commune, has a population of 254 inhabitants. Other settlements within the commune include the commune's administrative centre, Berg, as well as Mensdorf, Olingen, and Roodt-sur-Syre.

Betzdorf Castle is the headquarters of SES, the world's largest satellite operator in terms of revenue and one of the four largest components of the Luxembourg Stock Exchange's main LuxX Index.

Population

List of mayors

Footnotes

References

External links
 

 
Communes in Grevenmacher (canton)
Villages in Luxembourg